Home and Away: Hearts Divided is an exclusive-to-video and DVD special of Australia's most popular soap opera Home and Away.  It was released on 29 October 2003 and is hosted by Home and Away star Rebecca Cartwright.  It contains two episodes that aired on TV: "Turn Back the Night" and "Fallout", from the sixteenth season of Home and Away, plus the exclusive episode, Hearts Divided, which will not be aired on TV.  It was released in the same format as Secrets and the City, with two aired TV episodes and the special and again follows another terrible situation that the Sutherland family have to face.  Kane Phillips, the man who raped Dani Sutherland has returned to Summer Bay and comes between Dani and her sister Kirsty.

Episodes

Cast

Main cast
 Tammin Sursok - Dani Sutherland
 Rebecca Cartwright - Hayley Smith
 Christie Hayes - Kirsty Sutherland
 Kate Garven - Jade Sutherland
 Beau Brady - Noah Lawson
 Kip Gamblin - Scott Hunter
 Michael Beckley - Rhys Sutherland
 Ray Meagher - Alf Stewart
 Kate Ritchie - Sally Fletcher
 Mitch Firth - Seb Miller
 Ben Unwin - Jesse McGregor
 Joel McIlroy - Flynn Saunders
 Danny Raco - Alex Poulos
 Sebastian Elmaloglou - Max Sutherland

Guest cast
 Paula Forrest - Shelley Sutherland
 Sam Atwell - Kane Phillips
 Sophie Luck - Tamara Simpson
 Hollie Andrew - Mira Sadelic
 Angelo D'Angelo - Ross McLuhan
 Kim Hillas - Betty (woman on bus)
 Alan Dukes - Bill
 Kaja Trøa - Tracey (woman in car) (credited as Kaja Troa)
 Luke Stephens - The Man
 Rodney Power - Dr. Andrews (credited as Rod Power)
 Brigit Wolf - Nurse
 Robert Baxter - Bus Driver (credited as Rob Baxter)
 Scott McLean - Policeman #1
 Scott Parmeter - Policeman #2

DVD

Reception
As Secrets and the City, many fans were disappointed with the release of Hearts Divided, for the same reasons as the first release, two episode already having aired on TV and a special that was not much longer than the prior episodes.  There was also the fact that the release was rated PG, while the television airings for the first two episode where G-rated, but it did not seem anymore adult themed, as G is only the television rating and the show would receive a PG or even an M rating anyway, although fans were hoping for an M rating, the release did take advantage of the more extreme PG rating.  The DVD release was not very big on extras as it featured short behind-the-scenes footage, A Day in the Life of Bec and Beau which was featured on the previous release and Emmanuel Carella's music video "Don't Say a Word".

Book

Book based on the Home and Away episode Hearts Divided

There's turmoil in Summer Bay and Rhys Sutherland and his family are right in the middle of it.  Kirsty and Dani were loyal, loving sisters.  Fiercely, unconditionally proud of each other - until the dark influence of Kane Phillips pervaded their lives in ways that no one ever imagined.  Now Dani is accused of trying to kill the man who ruined her life two years ago, while Kirsty is leaving Summer Bay to be by his side.  But Kirsty's journey away from her family takes her into uncharted waters and unexpected dangers.

The book was written in by Leon F. Saunders and released in 2003.

See also
 Home and Away
 Home and Away: Secrets and the City
 Home and Away: Romances
 Home and Away: Weddings

References

External links
 Home and Away: Hearts Divided at the Internet Movie Database
 Home and Away at the Internet Movie Database
 Home and Away official site
 backtothebay.net

Home and Away spin-offs
Novels based on television series
pl:Home and Away